The 1992–93 season of competitive football (soccer) in Lithuania was the third season since the nation regained its independence from the Soviet Union in 1991. In the Premier League, named A Lyga, fourteen teams competed, with FK Ekranas winning the title.

A Lyga

Regular season

Standings

Results

Championship round

Standings

Results

Relegation round

Standings

Results

1 Lyga

See also
1992 in Lithuanian football
1993 in Lithuanian football

References
 RSSSF

LFF Lyga seasons
1993 in Lithuanian football
1992 in Lithuanian football
Lith